Nørrebros Runddel station is an underground Copenhagen Metro station located at Nørrebros Runddel in the Nørrebro district of Copenhagen, Denmark. The station is on the City Circle Line (M3), between  Nuuks Plads and Nørrebro, and is in fare zone 2.

History
The site was formerly part of Assistens Cemetery. The station was opened on 29 September 2019 together with 16 other stations of the line.

The station is built below Nørrebros Runddel, at the intersection of Nørrebrogade and Jagtvej, close to the Assistens Cemetery.

Design
The main staircase faces Nørrebros Runddel. The escalator shaft is clad with yellow, ceramic panels, a reference to the yellow wall that surrounds the cemetery.

Service

References

City Circle Line (Copenhagen Metro) stations
Railway stations opened in 2019
2019 establishments in Denmark
Railway stations in Denmark opened in the 21st century